Aspley House is a Grade II* listed 17th-century country house near Aspley Guise in Bedfordshire, England.

References 

Buildings and structures completed in 1690
Houses completed in 1690
Country houses in Bedfordshire
Grade II* listed buildings in Bedfordshire
Grade II* listed houses